It's All Good: The Best of Damien Dempsey is a compilation album by Irish singer-songwriter Damien Dempsey, released in February 2014.

Track listing 
The album contains twenty-nine tracks over two discs.

References

2014 compilation albums
Damien Dempsey albums